The 2016 Champions Indoor Football season was the second season of the CIF. It started on Saturday, February 27, when the Omaha Beef traveled to Iowa, losing to the Sioux City Bandits 43-38, and the San Angelo Bandits traveled to Kansas to play the Dodge City Law, a game won by Dodge City, 59-37. The regular season concluded on Sunday, June 5, when the Sioux City Bandits traveled to Illinois to play the Bloomington Edge. The Edge won, 48-38.

The league champion was the Wichita Force, who defeated the Amarillo Venom 48-45 in Champions Bowl II. The season MVP was Robert Kent of the Texas Revolution, and the Champions Bowl MVP was Wichita's David Olson.

League changes

Standings

Playoffs

External links
 Official website